The Japan J.League clubs in the AFC Champions League. This details the participation and performances in the competition since its rebranding and reformatting in 2002 and excludes the details of the old AFC Club Championship.(This does not apply to the finalists) ، The first Japanese club to participate in the competition was Toyo Kogyo who won third place in the 1969 edition.

Overview

Results
 PO: Play-off round, GS: Group Stage, R16: Round of 16, QF: Quarterfinals, SF: Semifinals, RU: Runners-Up, W: Winners

Finals

Statistics by club

Updated to 2021 season after Final

Statistics by season

Updated to 2021 season after Final

Games by club 

Updated to 2021 season after Final

Cerezo Osaka

FC Tokyo

Gamba Osaka

Júbilo Iwata

Kashima Antlers

Kashiwa Reysol

Kawasaki Frontale

Nagoya Grampus

Sanfrecce Hiroshima

Shimizu S-Pulse

Tokyo Verdy

Urawa Red Diamonds

Vegalta Sendai

Vissel Kobe

Yokohama F. Marinos

Statistics by opponents league 
Updated to 2021 season after Final

A-League

Chinese Super League

Hong Kong Premier League

Liga Indonesia

Iran Pro League

K League

Kuwaiti Premier League

Malaysia Super League

Philippines Football League

Saudi Professional League

S.League

Syrian Premier League

Thailand Premier League

UAE Pro-League

Uzbek League

V-League

See also 
 Australian clubs in the AFC Champions League
 Chinese clubs in the AFC Champions League
 Indian football clubs in Asian competitions
 Indonesian football clubs in Asian competitions
 Iranian clubs in the AFC Champions League
 Iraqi clubs in the AFC Champions League
 Myanmar clubs in the AFC Champions League
 Qatari clubs in the AFC Champions League
 Saudi Arabian clubs in the AFC Champions League
 South Korean clubs in the AFC Champions League
 Thai clubs in the AFC Champions League
 Vietnamese clubs in the AFC Champions League

References 
 AFC Champions League Official website
 AFC Champions League on RSSSF

Football clubs in the AFC Champions League
 AFC Champions League
Japanese football clubs in international competitions